Eddy Helmi Bin Abdul Manan (born 8 December 1979 in Pontian, Johor) is a former Malaysian international footballer who played as an attacking midfielder. 

Eddy is one of longest serving player in the Johor FC. On 18 December 2014, he signed a contract with Sime Darby.

International career
Eddy started representing the team in 2001. In 2002, Eddy received his first call-up for the Malaysia national team. He made his full international debut against Singapore. He played in the 2002 Asian Games with Malaysia U-23. He also played two ASEAN Football Championship with Malaysia in 2002 and 2007. He was also included in the 2007 Asian Cup squad, playing only one match, against China.

Honours

Club
Johor FC
 Liga Perdana 2 : 2001

References

External links
 
 Eddy Helmi Abdul Manan Statistics

1979 births
Living people
Malaysian people of Malay descent
Malaysian footballers
Malaysia international footballers
2007 AFC Asian Cup players
People from Johor
Johor Darul Ta'zim F.C. players
Negeri Sembilan FA players
Sime Darby F.C. players
Malaysia Super League players
Association football midfielders
Footballers at the 2002 Asian Games
Asian Games competitors for Malaysia